Northern Sumatra may refer to:

 The northern portion of the island of Sumatra
 Aceh, the northernmost province of Sumatra
 North Sumatra, the province south of Aceh